Medina High School (abbreviated MHS) is a public high school located in Medina, Ohio, United States. It serves 2,108 students in grades 912. It is the only high school in the Medina City School District and the only high school in the city.

School characteristics
 Colors: Green and White 
 Nickname: The Battling Bees, or Bees
 Athletic conference: Greater Cleveland Conference
 Fight Song: The Ohio State University's "Fight the Team Across the Field"

History
Medina High School opened in its current location in the fall of 1973. In 2004, major renovations and additions were completed, doubling the school's capacity and adding both a new community recreation center and a performing-arts center.  Prior to 1973, Medina High School existed within the buildings that are now Garfield Elementary School, the Medina County Administration Building, and Claggett Middle School.

Neighborhoods
The facility underwent major renovations and additions which concluded in the fall of 2003. After the completion of the renovations, the "house" concept was introduced.  The school was originally divided into four "houses", each with its own principal. Students stayed within their "house" for as many core classes as possible, but were permitted to take classes outside of their "house" as well.
 
In the 2009-2010 school year, the neighborhood concept was presented.  The four "houses" were combined into two "neighborhoods" with its own core academic area, principal, faculty, and guidance counselors. Students with the letters A-K in their last name are in "House White". Students with letters L-Z starting their last name are in "House Green". A centralized food preparation area and two cafeteria/serving areas support the houses. In partnership with the City of Medina, the Medina Community Recreation Center and Performing Arts Center are directly attached to the high school building and are available for community use.

Activities

Performing arts
The school has an extensive performing arts program, with multiple choirs and orchestras, as well as several concert band programs. The Medina High School symphony orchestra was recently invited to Russia to perform at the Grand Philharmonic Hall in Saint Petersburg. The school houses a performing arts center that seats a total of 1,133 people.

Marching band
In addition to the school's concert bands, the Medina High School Marching Band (also known as "The Medina Musical Bees") is a competitive marching band that performs halftime shows for the school's varsity football team, as well as competes in several Ohio Music Education Association adjudicated performances each year. The band has won many awards and has consistently receiving "Superior" ratings at state competition.

State championships

 Girls Rugby - 2018

 Boys Rugby - 2022

 Girls Lacrosse - 2010, 2011, 2012
 Girls Soccer – 1997, 2009
 Boys Cross Country – 2007
 Boys  Lacrosse-2003
 Boys  Soccer-2018

Notable alumni
 Matt Amodio, Class of 2009, 38-time Jeopardy! champion
 William G. Batchelder, Class of 1960, former speaker of the Ohio House of Representatives, 2011–2014
 John Nelson, Class of 2017, professional soccer player in Major League Soccer
 Matthew Patrick, also known as MatPat, Class of 2005, creator and narrator of the Youtube series Game Theorist and founder of Theorist Media.
 Fremont O. Phillips, Class of 1874, Republican Congressman in U.S. House of Representatives, 1899–1901
 Clay Pickering, professional football player in the National Football League (NFL); transferred after his freshman year
 Bobby Rahal, Class of 1971, professional race car driver & winner of the Indianapolis 500 in 1986
 Mason Schreck, Class of 2012, professional football player in the NFL
 Jon Teske, Class of 2016, professional basketball player

References

External links
 Official website

High schools in Medina County, Ohio
Public high schools in Ohio